Christina Ann McNichol (born September 11, 1962) is an American former actress. She is known for such film roles as Angel in Little Darlings, Polly in Only When I Laugh, and Barbara Weston in the TV sitcom Empty Nest. She won two Emmy Awards for her portrayal of teenage daughter Letitia "Buddy" Lawrence in the TV drama Family. McNichol retired from acting in 2001.

Early life, family and education 

McNichol was born on September 11, 1962, in Los Angeles, California, the daughter of James and Carolyn McNichol. Her father was a carpenter and her mother worked odd jobs to support the family, including as a secretary, cosmetics salesperson and movie extra. McNichol is Scottish/Irish on her father's side and her mother is of Lebanese descent.

Career
She appeared with her brother Jimmy McNichol in commercials and later, on her own, in guest appearances on such other series as Starsky & Hutch; The Bionic Woman; Love, American Style; and The Love Boat, thanks to family friend Desi Arnaz. Her first stint as a series regular came in the role of Patricia Apple in the short-lived television series Apple's Way (1974).

In 1976, she was cast as Letitia "Buddy" Lawrence in the television drama series Family (1976–80). She was nominated for the Emmy Award for Best Supporting Actress in a Dramatic Series three years in a row (1977–79), winning in 1977 and 1979.

In 1977, she appeared in the TV special The Carpenters at Christmas, performing several musical numbers with the duo. In 1978, Jimmy and she made their foray into music, recording the album Kristy and Jimmy McNichol for RCA Records (AFL1-2875). Produced by Phil Margo and Mitch Margo, it included the singles "He's So Fine" (a cover of The Chiffons' 1963 hit), which peaked at number 70 on the Billboard chart and "Page by Page". The McNichols promoted the album at New York's Studio 54 discothèque with other celebrities. In 1978, McNichol performed with Jimmy in a second Carpenters' holiday special, titled The Carpenters: A Christmas Portrait.

McNichol was one of the bigger teen stars of that era. She appeared on talk shows such as The Mike Douglas Show and Dinah! and made several appearances on Battle of the Network Stars and other celebrity-based sports shows. In 1978, she starred in the acclaimed TV movie Summer of My German Soldier.

McNichol began her film career in 1977 in Black Sunday, but her scenes were cut. In 1978, she starred with Burt Reynolds and Sally Field in the black comedy The End.

In 1980, she played one of the leading roles in the hit coming-of-age movie Little Darlings, which also starred Tatum O'Neal, with Matt Dillon and Cynthia Nixon in supporting roles. Her performance was acclaimed by many reviewers, including those who disliked the film. Later in 1980, she appeared with Dennis Quaid and Mark Hamill in The Night the Lights Went Out in Georgia, for which she received a six-figure salary—unprecedented for a teenager. In 1981, she co-starred in Neil Simon's Only When I Laugh and was nominated for a Golden Globe Award for Best Supporting Actress.

McNichol was nominated for a Golden Raspberry Award for Worst Actress for her performance in the 1982 movie The Pirate Movie. The same year, she suffered an emotional breakdown while playing the lead role in the comedy-drama Just the Way You Are that was being filmed in France. She later told People magazine that she could not sleep and she cried the entire time she was in France.  She had nightmares when she did sleep and she cried on set. She did not return to the production after Christmas to finish the movie; filming had to be interrupted for a year while McNichol recovered. She later said that the breakdown had been caused by the pressures of her childhood career, as well as the pressure to hide her sexuality from the public..

In 1986, McNichol appeared in Women of Valor, a TV movie about American nurses in a World War II Japanese POW camp. She made two theatrical films in 1988: You Can't Hurry Love and Two Moon Junction.

In the same year, she began the role of Barbara Weston on Empty Nest, a spin-off of The Golden Girls. She left the show in 1992 after being diagnosed with bipolar disorder but returned for its final episode in 1995. It was her last on-screen performance. However, she later voiced characters in the animated TV series Extreme Ghostbusters (1997) and Invasion America (1998).

After acting life

In June 2001, McNichol announced that she had retired from acting. Her publicist released this statement:

After her retirement, McNichol taught acting at a private school in Los Angeles and devoted much of her time to charity work. In 2012, McNichol ended years of speculation when she revealed that she is a lesbian and has lived with her partner Martie Allen since the early 1990s. She made the statement in the hopes that her openness would help young people who are bullied because of their sexual orientation. 
McNichol also made it clear in the same statement that she has no plans to return to acting.

Filmography

Film

Television

Awards

Wins
1977 Emmy for Family
1979 Emmy for Family
1980 People's Choice Award for "Favorite Young Motion Picture Actress"
1982 Young Artist Award for Only When I Laugh

Nominations
1978 Emmy for Family
1979 Golden Globe for Family
1980 Emmy for Family
Young Artist Award for Family
1981 Young Artist Award for My Old Man and Little Darlings
1982 Golden Globe for Only When I Laugh

References

External links

 

1962 births
Living people
20th-century American actresses
Actresses from Los Angeles
American voice actresses
American child actresses
American film actresses
American people of Irish descent
American people of Lebanese descent
American television actresses
American women comedians
Outstanding Performance by a Supporting Actress in a Drama Series Primetime Emmy Award winners
American lesbian actresses
LGBT people from California
People with bipolar disorder
21st-century American women